Steve Fox is a Canadian singer-songwriter. He was born in Brampton, Ontario and raised in Coquitlam, British Columbia, a suburb of Vancouver.  He then moved to Toronto in the early 1980s to pursue a career in music. He got his break in 1995 with a rock LP "Where The Blue Moon Rises" followed by a CD "The Days Of My Youth", but in 2001 he released his platinum album Small World which led to notable singles "Small Town", "Cheap Red Wine" and "Couple On The Cake", a duet with Beverley Mahood and a video featuring Leslie Nielsen. Steve released the album "Lunch With Chet" with the single "Dream On". He also is noted for writing the Montgomery Gentry single "Daddy Won't Sell The Farm". Currently, Steve is producing records for other artists. Steve released his single "If My Life Was a Movie" in January 2007.

Discography

Studio albums

Singles

Music videos

External links
 

Canadian male singer-songwriters
Canadian country singer-songwriters
Year of birth missing (living people)
Living people
Musicians from Brampton
People from Coquitlam
20th-century Canadian male singers
20th-century Canadian guitarists
21st-century Canadian guitarists
Canadian male guitarists
21st-century Canadian male singers